Ernle David Drummond Money  (17 February 1931 – 14 April 2013) was a Conservative Party Member of Parliament for Ipswich.

Biography
Money was educated at Marlborough College and Oriel College, Oxford. He served in the Suffolk Regiment from 1949 to 1951. He was called to the Bar in 1958.

Money was elected MP for Ipswich in the 1970 general election with a majority of only 13 votes, the lowest majority of that election.  The first Conservative to win the seat since the Second World War, he defeated Labour incumbent Sir Dingle Foot (Michael Foot's brother) and was reelected in the February 1974 election with a slightly increased majority of 259, although he subsequently lost the seat in the October 1974 election to Labour's Kenneth Weetch by a margin of 1,733 votes.

Money retired to Eastbourne in the 1990s. In 2010 he was reported in local press urging voters not to re-elect Eastbourne's Conservative MP Nigel Waterson but instead to vote for his LibDem opponent Stephen Lloyd.  Money had homes in both Eastbourne and Malta.

References 

Times Guide to the House of Commons October 1974

External links 
 

1931 births
2013 deaths
Conservative Party (UK) MPs for English constituencies
Members of the Parliament of the United Kingdom for Ipswich
People educated at Marlborough College
Alumni of Oriel College, Oxford
Commanders of the Order of the British Empire
UK MPs 1970–1974
UK MPs 1974
Ernle family
Suffolk Regiment officers